Ian Wilfred Rice (born 1939) is an Australian businessman and former president of the Carlton Football Club. He replaced George Harris in a caretaker role in December 1979,  but held the position until his resignation in September 1983.

A property developer originally from Brisbane, he was a part-owner, with politician Andrew Peacock, of the 1974 Caulfield Cup winner Leilani.  He was the initial franchisee of the Kentucky Fried Chicken chain in Victoria. He later became a City of Melbourne councillor in 1970 and twice ran for mayor of Melbourne during the 1970s.

References

External links
 Ian Rice at Blueseum

1939 births
Carlton Football Club administrators
Living people
Businesspeople from Brisbane
Victoria (Australia) local councillors